Xenophon Paionidis (1863–1933) was a Greek architect from Chalkidiki (Fourka), notable for his works in the city of Thessaloniki. Among his works are the "Villa Jeborga/Salem" (former Italian consulate, 1878), "Hafiz Bey mansion" (1879), Papafeio Orphanage (1894), Ioannidis civil school (1900), Nedelkos clinic (1909), Nedelkos building (1924), "Villa Mordoch" (1905), Hotel Augustos (1923), the old Post Office "Stoa Pelosof" (1924), and others.
 
In Chalkidiki, he designed the Polygyros high school, such as the schools of Ormylia, Nikiti, Vasilika, Vrastama, Sykia, and Parthenonas villages. His nephew Filimon Paionidis designed also some buildings in Thessaloniki.

Gallery

Sources
 Ξενοφών Παιονίδης, ο αρχιτέκτονας του κλασικισμού

1863 births
1933 deaths
Greek Macedonians
Greek architects
Greeks from the Ottoman Empire
Architects from the Ottoman Empire
Architecture of Thessaloniki
People from Kassandra